Eirspennill, also known as AM 47 fol, is a medieval manuscript which contains copies of four sagas: Heimskringla, Sverris saga, Böglunga sögur, and Hákonar saga Hákonarsonar. The manuscript is considered to date to the early 14th century, and a marginal note within states that in the mid 14th century it belonged to Þranðr Garðarson, Archbishop of Nidaros. The manuscript is believed to have been compiled by two Icelanders.

References

14th-century manuscripts
Sagas